The 2006 Houston Cougars football team, also known as the Houston Cougars, Houston, or UH represented the University of Houston in the 2006 NCAA Division I FBS football season.  It was the 61st year of season play for Houston. The team was coached by fourth year head football coach, Art Briles.  The team played its home games at Robertson Stadium, a 32,000-person capacity stadium on-campus in Houston.  After regular season play where Houston won the C-USA West division, the Cougars defeated the Southern Miss Golden Eagles in the Conference USA Football Championship to become conference champions for the first time since 1996.

Schedule

Game summaries

Rice

References

Houston
Houston Cougars football seasons
Conference USA football champion seasons
Houston Cougars football